Tona L. Rozum (born September 20, 1945) is an American politician and a former Republican member of the South Dakota House of Representatives representing District 20 from January 11, 2011, to January 8, 2019.

Elections
2012 Rozum and incumbent Representative Lance Carson were unopposed for the June 5, 2012 Republican Primary and won the four-way November 6, 2012 General election where Representative Carson took the first seat and Rozum took the second seat with 5,272 votes (28.85%) against Democratic nominees James Schorzmann and Dave Mitchell, who had run for the seat in 2006 and 2008.
2010 When incumbent Republican Representative Noel Hamiel left the Legislature and left a District 20 seat open, Rozum and incumbent Republican Representative Carson were unopposed for the June 8, 2010 Republican Primary and won the three-way November 2, 2010 General election where Representative Carson took the first seat and Rozum took the second seat with 4,611 votes (37.30%) against Independent Becky Haslam.

References

External links
Official page at the South Dakota Legislature
 

Place of birth missing (living people)
Living people
Republican Party members of the South Dakota House of Representatives
People from Mitchell, South Dakota
Women state legislators in South Dakota
1945 births
21st-century American politicians
21st-century American women politicians